Renzo Spinaci (born 8 March 1993) is an Argentine professional footballer who plays as a midfielder for Club Atlético Los Andes.

Career
Spinaci began with Sarmiento; signing in 1997. His bow in Primera B Nacional came during a 2–2 draw with Defensa y Justicia on 28 May 2013, four months after he made his senior bow in the Copa Argentina against Almirante Brown. Nineteen further appearances in all competitions subsequently arrived in two seasons, with the latter concluding with promotion to the Primera División. He featured sixteen times in the top-flight, twelve of which were starts, as they placed twenty-fourth. Spinaci scored his first goal at the Estadio Roberto Natalio Carminatti in stoppage time on 21 May 2016 as Sarmiento beat Olimpo, which saved them from relegation.

However, Sarmiento were relegated in the subsequent 2016–17 season - which was followed by Spinaci being loaned to Primera División team Tigre in August 2017. Nine appearances occurred in the first part of 2017–18; though the midfielder spending the rest of the campaign back with Sarmiento in Primera B Nacional. June 2018 saw Spinaci agree to join Villa Dálmine.

Career statistics
.

References

External links

1993 births
Living people
People from Junín, Buenos Aires
Argentine footballers
Association football midfielders
Primera Nacional players
Primera B Metropolitana players
Argentine Primera División players
Club Atlético Sarmiento footballers
Club Atlético Tigre footballers
Villa Dálmine footballers
Club Atlético Los Andes footballers
Sportspeople from Buenos Aires Province